In mathematics, the inverse bundle of a fibre bundle is its inverse with respect to the Whitney sum operation.

Let  be a fibre bundle. A bundle  is called the inverse bundle of  if their Whitney sum is a trivial bundle, namely if 

 

Any vector bundle over a compact Hausdorff base has an inverse bundle.

References
 

Differential topology
Algebraic topology